Kostajnik is a village in Serbia. It is situated in the Krupanj municipality, in the Mačva District of Central Serbia. Kostajnik is notable for being a fortified village since 1445. The village had a Serb ethnic majority and a population of 1,048 in 2002.

Historical population

1948: 1,431
1953: 1,621
1961: 1,671
1971: 1,506
1981: 1,364
1991: 1,264
2002: 1,048

See also
List of places in Serbia

References

External links
Kostajnik Official

Populated places in Mačva District